Sarov, Azerbaijan may refer to:
Sarov, Goranboy
Sarov, Tartar
Sarovlu